KTEZ (99.9 FM, "Easy 99.9") is a radio station broadcasting an adult contemporary music format. Licensed to Zwolle, Louisiana, United States, the station is currently owned by Baldridge-Dumas Communications, Inc. and features programming from Westwood One.

The call letters KTEZ were formerly assigned to 101.1 FM Lubbock Texas, now KONE FM, from 1974 to 2001.

References

External links

Radio stations in Louisiana
Mainstream adult contemporary radio stations in the United States
Radio stations established in 1990